A list of films produced in Egypt in 1936. For an A-Z list of films currently on Wikipedia, see :Category:Egyptian films.

External links
 Egyptian films of 1936 at the Internet Movie Database
 Egyptian films of 1936 elCinema.com

Lists of Egyptian films by year
1936 in Egypt
Lists of 1936 films by country or language